Henry Stanford Diltz (born September 6, 1938, in Kansas City, Missouri) is an American folk musician and photographer who has been active since the 1960s.

Career
Among the bands Diltz played with was the Modern Folk Quartet. While a member of the Modern Folk Quartet, Diltz became interested in photography, met The Monkees, played on some of their recording sessions, and took numerous photographs of the band, many of which have been published. His work also attracted the eye of other musicians who needed publicity and album cover photos. He was the official photographer at Woodstock, and at the Monterey Pop Festival and Miami Pop Festival, and has photographed over 200 record album covers.

Diltz photographed 1960s folk-rock stars who lived in Los Angeles's Laurel Canyon. During that time, Laurel Canyon was a center of American music. Many rising stars were drawn to Laurel Canyon, a laid-back neighborhood in the Hollywood Hills. Diltz recalled: "There was a sense of brotherhood in all of this - in the music scene, in Laurel Canyon, certainly at Woodstock. But all the people I photographed: I love their music."

In 1971, he and songwriter Jimmy Webb nearly died in a glider aircraft accident. Webb was piloting and Diltz was shooting 35mm motion picture film from the rear seat. Both suffered significant injuries. The film did not survive.

Diltz contributed all the photographs to the 1978 book California Rock, California Sound, which archived the Los Angeles music scene of the 1970s. British writer Anthony Fawcett provided the bulk of the text. He also has a book titled California Dreaming, from Genesis Publications UK. The self-published Unpainted Faces book of black and white photographs was released through Morrison Hotel Gallery.

Diltz is co-founder along with Peter Blachley and Rich Horowitz of the Morrison Hotel Gallery in SoHo, New York City, and in West Hollywood. The galleries specialize in fine-art music photography, including his own works.

Diltz is still active, including a role as contributing photographer to The Henry Rollins Show. He was among the 43 photographers invited to donate a print to "FOCUS: an auction of the finest photography to benefit City Harvest...." The fund-raiser was on September 18, 2008, supported City Harvest, a food collection bank in New York City.

Personal life
He has two children (Zoe Diltz Pratt and Nicholas Harrison Diltz) with Elizabeth Joy Grand Diltz.

Diltz lives in California. The archive in his bungalow in North Hollywood, California, holds some 800,000 photographs, alphabetized from "A" (for America) to "Z" (for Zappa).

References

External links
 

 Henry Diltz Interview NAMM Oral History Library (2018)

1938 births
Living people
Artists from Kansas City, Missouri
The Monkees
American photographers
Rock music photographers
Modern Folk Quartet members
People from Laurel Canyon, Los Angeles